John Cale Comes Alive is a second live album by Welsh musician John Cale released in September 1984 on ZE Records label after the previous album Caribbean Sunset (also 1984). It was recorded at The Lyceum in London, UK at 26 February 1984. It also includes two studio recordings "Ooh La La" and "Never Give Up". The album has not been released on compact disc or digital format. The US release has different versions of both studio tracks compared to the European version.

Track listing

Personnel
John Cale − guitar, piano, vocals, producer
Andy Heermans − bass, engineer on "Ooh La La" and "Never Give Up"
David Lichtenstein − drums, electronic drums, engineer on "Ooh La La" and "Never Give Up"
David Young − guitar, engineer on "Ooh La La" and "Never Give Up"
Julius Klepacz - drums on "Never Give Up"
Technical
Stephen Street − remix engineer
Roddy Hui − engineer on "Ooh La La" and "Never Give Up"
Frank Olinsky/Manhattan Design - art direction
George DuBose - photography
Sara Schwartz - cover illustration

References

External links
 

John Cale live albums
1984 live albums
Albums produced by John Cale
ZE Records albums